Pablo Barrios may refer to:

Pablo Barrios (equestrian) (born 1964), Venezuelan equestrian
Pablo Barrios (footballer) (born 2003), Spanish footballer